Kelley Law (born January 11, 1966, in Burnaby, British Columbia),  Atkins, formerly Owen, is a Canadian curler from Coquitlam, British Columbia. She grew up in Maple Ridge, British Columbia.

Career
Law is most notable for winning a bronze medal at the 2002 Winter Olympics in Salt Lake City, Utah, for Canada, with her team of Julie Skinner (Third), Georgina Wheatcroft (Second) and Diane Nelson (Lead). She had an 8-1 record going into the playoffs but lost the semi-final to Great Britain's Rhona Martin who would eventually claim gold. Kelley beat the United States' Kari Erickson for the bronze medal. Law also won the 2000 Scott Tournament of Hearts which qualified her for that year's World Championships, which she also won. The following year she was runner-up at the 2001 Scott Tournament of Hearts where she lost in the final to Nova Scotia's Colleen Jones. Law would take a few years off from curling, and her team split up, with Wheatcroft going on to skip her own team to the 2004 Scott Tournament of Hearts. Wheatcroft then went on to play with Jennifer Jones from the 2005-06 season before returning to play with Law in 2006.

Law returned in 2006 from a curling hiatus which involved having a baby and becoming a certified real estate agent for RE/MAX. 
In 2007, Law has made her way back to the national championship, now called the Scotties Tournament of Hearts after winning the B.C. Provincial championship on January 28, 2007, with her new team. At the 2007 Scotties Tournament of Hearts, Law finished with a 5-6 record.

Law has decided to take the 2007-2008 season off due to her work commitments.  As a result, her team has separated.  Her former third, Georgina Wheatcroft and lead, Darah Provençal have left to join Colleen Jones to form a new team.

References

External links
 

1966 births
Living people
Canadian women curlers
Curlers from British Columbia
People from Coquitlam
Olympic curlers of Canada
Olympic bronze medalists for Canada
People from Burnaby
Curlers at the 2002 Winter Olympics
World curling champions
Canadian women's curling champions
Olympic medalists in curling
Medalists at the 2002 Winter Olympics
Continental Cup of Curling participants
Canada Cup (curling) participants